Tobias Brønnum Bjerg (born 21 April 1998) is a Danish swimmer. He competed in the men's 50 metre breaststroke at the 2019 World Aquatics Championships.

References

External links
 

1998 births
Living people
Place of birth missing (living people)
Swimmers at the 2015 European Games
European Games medalists in swimming
European Games bronze medalists for Denmark
Danish male breaststroke swimmers
Swimmers at the 2020 Summer Olympics
Olympic swimmers of Denmark
20th-century Danish people
21st-century Danish people